Karin Köllerer (born 8 October 1970) is a former Austrian alpine skier who won the Europa Cup overall title in 1995.

Career
During her career she has achieved 4 results among the top 3 in the World Cup.

World Cup results
Top 3

Europa Cup results
Köllerer has won an overall Europa Cup and one discipline cup.

FIS Alpine Ski Europa Cup
Overall: 1995
Super-G: 1990

National titles
Köllerer has won five national championships at individual senior level.

Austrian Alpine Ski Championships
Slalom: 1995, 1998, 2000 (3)
Combined: 1988, 1993 (2)

References

External links
 
 

1970 births
Living people
Austrian female alpine skiers